Gradec is a village in the municipality of Valandovo, North Macedonia. Nearby is the site of ancient Stena.

References

External links

Villages in Valandovo Municipality